The 1980 Australian Touring Car Championship was an Australian motor racing competition for Group C Touring Cars. Authorised by the Confederation of Australian Motor Sport as a National Title, it was the 21st Australian Touring Car Championship.

The championship was won by Peter Brock driving a Holden Commodore VB.

Season Summary
Peter Brock won his third and final ATCC title, driving a Holden VB Commodore for the Marlboro Holden Dealer Team which he had purchased from team owner/manager John Sheppard in late 1979 after Holden had pulled out of the sport following the domination by the Toranas in 1978 and 1979. After buying the team, Brock, backed by Adelaide based Holden dealer Vin Keane, actually went around Australia to the Holden dealers in a successful attempt to help finance the team which also saw the launch of the HDT Special Vehicles which built "hotter" versions of the road-going Holden Commodore. This effectively meant that for the first time since being founded by Harry Firth in 1969, the HDT was actually a Dealers Team rather than a backdoor factory operation. Brock and Sheppard had been secretly testing a VB Commodore in late 1979 in readiness for the rule changes enforced by CAMS. These rule changes aimed at reducing engine emissions, mostly sparked by the 1970s Oil Crisis, effectively made the Toranas and Falcon Hardtops of the previous years ineligible. By the start of the ATCC, Brock and the HDT were the only team anywhere near ready to race, and it showed in the results. Brock won four of the eight rounds, including the opening three rounds. He also put his Commodore on pole position at each round of the championship.

Former twice CAMS Gold Star winner and 1974 Hardie-Ferodo 1000 winner Kevin Bartlett recovered from his 1979 Formula 5000 crash and finished second in the championship in his Channel 9 sponsored Chevrolet Camaro Z28 (financed by Nine's owner, media magnate and one of the richest people in Australia, Kerry Packer). Bartlett broke Brock's winning run, using the superior power of the 5.7-litre Chevrolet to win at Sandown, and would later win the penultimate round in Adelaide. Bartlett's win at Sandown was the first non-Ford or Holden outright ATCC win since Bob Jane took his championship winning Chevrolet Camaro ZL-1 to victory in Round 6 of the 1972 ATCC at Surfers Paradise.

Sydney based Toyota dealer Peter Williamson finished third in the championship in his Class B Toyota Celica, benefiting from class wins and generally poor or small fields (especially in the outright Class A) resulting from teams rushing to get the new generation cars race ready.

Reigning champion Bob Morris had lost his major sponsor when Ron Hodgson had pulled out at the end of 1979, so Morris entered into an uneasy relationship with Allan Grice's Craven Mild Racing which was run by Morris' former Bathurst co-driver Frank Gardner. Grice drove one of the 1979 Toranas to victory at Wanneroo in Perth. Grice only competed in four rounds and finished eighth in the title. Morris endured an unhappy championship trying to develop the teams Commodore and could only finish fifth on points, though he did win the final round at Oran Park.

After Ford Australia pulled out of racing at the end of 1978, and being forced to go it alone as a privateer in 1979, the 1980 ATCC was the first time since 1968 that triple champion Allan Moffat did not contest the championship, with the Canadian born driver instead winning the Australian Sports Car Championship in a Porsche 930 Turbo.

After winning four ATCC titles during the 1970s, this would prove to be the only ATCC won by a Holden driver during the 1980s. The next win would not be until 1994.

Teams and drivers
The following drivers and teams competed in the 1980 Australian Touring Car Championship.

Race calendar
The championship was contested over eight rounds, each comprising either one race or two heats.

Classes
Cars competed in two displacement classes:
 Up to and including 3000cc 
 3001 to 6000cc 

The up to and including 3000cc class was contested by Alfa Romeo Alfetta, Ford Capri, Ford Escort, Isuzu Gemini, Mazda RX-3, Mazda RX-7, Toyota Celica and Toyota Corolla.

The 3001 to 6000cc class was contested by Chevrolet Camaro, Ford Falcon, Holden Commodore and Holden Torana.

Points system
Points were awarded for the first four outright places at each round on a 4-3-2-1 basis. In addition, points were awarded  for the first six places in each class at each round on a 9-6-4-3-2-1 basis. Drivers had to drop their worst score from the eight rounds.

Championship standings

References

Australian Touring Car Championship seasons
Touring Car Championship